Lecong is a town in Shunde District, Foshan City, Guangdong province, Southern China.

Geography
Lecong is situated in the hinterland of the Pearl River Delta, the northwestward of Shunde and the south of the central urban area of Foshan. There are less than 30 km from Lecong to Guangzhou and only over 100 km to Hong Kong and Macau.

Transportation
The National Highway 325 runs through from the south to the north.

Economy
The 3 big markets help developing the economy in Lecong that make Lecong become one of the richest towns in Shunde. There are the furniture market, steel market and the plastic market.

References

External links
 Official Lecong, Shunde Gov website
 Lecong Steel World Website

Shunde District
Towns in Guangdong